Remise à Jorelle is a railway station located on the Île-de-France tramway Line 4 in the commune of Bondy.

External links
 

Railway stations in France opened in 2006
Railway stations in Seine-Saint-Denis